Daharro is a town in the central Hiran region of Somalia. It's mostly inhabited by the Xawaadle sub clan of the larger hawiye Somali clan.

References
Daharro

Populated places in Hiran, Somalia